Niels Peter Louis-Hansen (born 25 October 1947) is a Danish billionaire businessman, deputy chairman and owner of one-fifth of the medical device company Coloplast.

Early life
Niels Peter Louis-Hansen was born in Denmark, the son of Aage Louis-Hansen and Johanne Louis-Hansen.  Coloplast was founded by his father in 1957, who took it public in 1983. Louis-Hansen has a bachelor's degree.

Career
Louis-Hansen became a board member of Coloplast when his father died in 1966, and the company was continued by his mother. His mother was active in the company until the early 1970s.

Louis-Hansen owns 20.7% of Coloplast directly, making him the company's largest shareholder. He also owns 15.6% of Ambu, and via the investment company N.P. Louis-Hansen ApS, is a major shareholder in the unlisted biotech company Virogates.

Bloomberg News estimated his net worth at US$7 billion in 2018.

Personal life
Louis-Hansen is married, with one daughter, and lives in Humlebaek. He is also the owner of Tustrup Manor at Randers.

References 

1947 births
Living people
20th-century Danish businesspeople
21st-century Danish businesspeople
Danish billionaires
People from Fredensborg Municipality
20th-century Danish landowners
21st-century Danish landowners